Peter Henry Cook (1 February 1927 – 1960) was an English footballer.

He played for Kingston Wolves, Hull City, Scarborough, Bradford City and Crewe Alexandra.

Notes

1927 births
1960 deaths
Footballers from Kingston upon Hull
English footballers
Association football forwards
Hull City A.F.C. players
Scarborough F.C. players
Bradford City A.F.C. players
Crewe Alexandra F.C. players
English Football League players